"Candid Photography", better known as "Nudge Nudge", is a sketch from the third Monty Python's Flying Circus episode, "How to Recognise Different Types of Trees From Quite a Long Way Away" (series 1, ep. 3) featuring Eric Idle (author of the sketch) and Terry Jones as two strangers who meet in a pub.

Sketch description
Idle (playing a character sometimes referred to as "Arthur Nudge") sits too close to an unassuming pub patron played by Terry Jones. Idle asks Jones a series of questions about his romantic relationships that seem odd and cryptic, but that are eventually revealed to be complex double entendres. Jones becomes irritated by the line of questioning and asks Idle, directly, what he is implying. Idle forwardly admits that he really wants to know whether Jones has ever "slept with a lady." When Jones directly answers "Yes," Idle curiously asks him, "What's it like?" This conclusion makes it one of the few Monty Python sketches to end on a clear punch line.

In other Monty Python material
The sketch appears in the 1971 spin-off feature film, And Now for Something Completely Different and the 1982 concert film Monty Python Live at the Hollywood Bowl. It was also performed when the Pythons appeared on The Midnight Special and was recorded for the 1976 concert album Monty Python Live at City Center.

In its original airing on Monty Python's Flying Circus, the sketch was preceded by a short link in which Idle, Terry Jones and Michael Palin portray schoolboys being interviewed for television by John Cleese. During the interview, Idle announces that he's written a sketch called "Nudge Nudge".

In And Now for Something Completely Different, the sketch is followed by a cut to a scene in a gym, where Terry Gilliam dressed as a nun on an ergometer replies (dubbed by a female voice), "I think it's overrated." Then, the "Self-Defence Against Fresh Fruit" sketch is played in the setting.

Idle's character in the pub makes several cameo appearances in later episodes, referred to as "Arthur Name".

In Monty Python Live (Mostly), the sketch segues from "Albatross". In the background, a piano version of "Never Be Rude to an Arab" is heard. Eventually the sketch segues into a new opening title song for Blackmail which incorporates samples of Idle's Nudge, Nudge dialogue.

History
Originally written by Eric Idle for Ronnie Barker in another comedy show, the sketch was then rejected as a script. Eric Idle openly admits the script is confusing, the joke being mostly in the delivery.

Reception
The phrases, "nudge nudge" and "wink wink", are part of the English lexicon as idiomatic phrases implying sexual innuendo.

Elvis Presley was a great fan of Monty Python. In an extra on the Rutles DVD, Idle states that "Nudge Nudge" was Presley's favourite Python sketch and was the origin of Elvis' habit of referring to people as "squire."

Idle reprised the sketch in TV advertisements for Breakaway and Nudge chocolate bars, with the punch line changed to include the product name. A reference to this is clearly heard on Monty Python Live at Drury Lane.

References

External links
 The script
 http://www.montypython.net/scripts/nudge.php

Monty Python sketches
1969 neologisms
Comedy catchphrases
Quotations from television